Victor Abimbola Olaiya , (31 December 1930 – 12 February 2020), also known as Dr Victor Olaiya, was a Nigerian trumpeter who played in the highlife style. Though famous in Nigeria during the 1950s and early 1960s, Olaiya received little recognition outside his native country.  Alhaji Alade Odunewu of the Daily Times called him "The Evil Genius of Highlife."

Early life
Olaiya was born on 31 December 1930, in Calabar, Cross River State, the 20th child of a family of 24. His parents, Alfred Omolona Olaiya and Bathsheba Owolabi Motajo, came from Ijesha-Ishu in Ekiti State. 

Olaiya came from a very rich family. His father's house, Ilọijọs Bar, stood at 2 Bamgbose Street, Lagos Island, until it was demolished in September 2016.

Career
At an early age he learned to play the bombardon and the French horn. After leaving school he moved to Lagos, where he passed the school certificate examination in 1951 and was accepted by Howard University, US, to study civil engineering. Olaiya instead pursued a career as a musician, to the disapproval of his parents. He played with the Sammy Akpabot Band, was leader and trumpeter for the Old Lagos City Orchestra and joined the Bobby Benson Jam Session Orchestra.

In 1954, Olaiya formed his own band, the Cool Cats, playing popular highlife music. His band was chosen to play at the state ball when Queen Elizabeth II of the UK visited Nigeria in 1956, and later to play at the state balls when Nigeria became independent in 1960 and when Nigeria became a republic in 1963. On the latter occasion, Olaiya shared the stage with the American jazz musician Louis Armstrong. During the Nigerian Civil War of 1967–70, Olaiya was given the rank of a lieutenant colonel (honorary) in the Nigerian army, and his band played for the troops at various locations. The Cool Cats later travelled to the Congo to perform for United Nations troops.

Olaiya renamed his band to the All Stars Band when they played the 1963 International Jazz Festival in Czechoslovakia.

Olaiya also ran a business that imported and distributed musical instruments and accessories in West Africa, he also established the Stadium Hotel in Surulere.

Olaiya was bestowed the second rank (officer) of the national Order of the Niger award. In 1990, he received a fellowship of the Institute of Administrative Management of Nigeria. For a period, he was also president of the Nigerian Union of Musicians.

Personal life 
Olaiya had several wives. He had children and grandchildren. One of his daughters, Moji Olaiya, was a Nollywood actress. He sang with his son Bayode Olaiya.

Olaiya died on 12 February 2020 at the Lagos University Teaching Hospital, at age 89.

Music
Olaiya's music bridges between Ghanaian highlife and what would become Afrobeat.

His musical style was influenced by James Brown, with horn parts harmonised in Brown's style, as opposed to the mostly unison lines of Afrobeat. The music includes the swinging percussion of Tony Allen, but not the syncopated style that Allen later pioneered.

Olaiya released an album with Ghanaian highlife musician E. T. Mensah.
Both the drummer Tony Allen and vocalist Fela Kuti played with Olaiya and went on to achieve individual success.

Discography
A partial list of albums:

Further reading

References

External links

Nigerian male musicians
Yoruba musicians
1930 births
2020 deaths
People from Calabar
20th-century Nigerian musicians
21st-century Nigerian musicians
Yoruba-language singers
People of the Nigerian Civil War
Nigerian hoteliers
Musicians from Lagos
Nigerian highlife musicians
20th-century male musicians
21st-century male musicians
Nigerian trumpeters
Highlife musicians